Conviction is a novel published in 2004 by Richard North Patterson. The novel centers on the debate surrounding capital punishment.

Plot summary
As described by Sherryl Connelly of the New York Daily News,

Critical reception
Sherryl Connelly of the New York Daily News said that "Patterson too fully explores the political climate that predisposes judges against defendants in death penalty appeals" and that he "wallows in the legal complexities".

References

2005 American novels
American thriller novels

Capital punishment in the United States